East Farleigh Bridge is a road bridge across the River Medway in East Farleigh, Kent, England.

The bridge is medieval and was probably constructed in the 14th century. It comprises four arches, spanning the river and a smaller, later arch spanning the north bank. A long retaining wall carrying the road over the low-lying meadow to the south of the river has a blind arch on one side. The bridge is a Grade I listed building and a scheduled ancient monument.

It is built of coursed rag-stone with ashlar capping stones to the parapets. The bridge is narrow, only wide enough to permit traffic to pass in one direction at a time. The bridge features substantial cutwaters on each side. It has been described as "probably the finest medieval bridge in the south of England".

See also
Grade I listed buildings in Maidstone
List of scheduled monuments in Maidstone

References

Borough of Maidstone
Grade I listed buildings in Kent
Scheduled monuments in Kent
Bridges in Kent
Road bridges in England